"Runaway" is a song by Irish family band the Corrs, released in September 1995 as the debut single from their first album, Forgiven, Not Forgotten (1995). It had middling chart success except in Ireland and Australia, peaking at number 10 in both countries. It was also an adult contemporary hit in Canada, reaching number two on the RPM Adult Contemporary Tracks chart and number 25 on the RPM 100 Hit Tracks chart. On the UK Singles Chart, it originally reached number 49, but a re-release in 1999 saw the single reach a new peak of number two on the same chart.

Background and composition
The song was written by Andrea, Sharon and Caroline Corr, and co-produced by their older brother Jim and David Foster. Andrea has said the first time she sang it in front of her parents, she was embarrassed because of the line "make love to me through the night" and noted that she knew her mother would be thinking "where did she learn that?!"

The song has a subtle key change. It is written in F major, but towards the end, the fourth (a B flat) gets augmented (becoming a B), so the key changes to lydian mode. Rhythmically, a similar change happens in the drums, which initially play a slow 6/8th. In the end, a snare drum is played on the 2-eh and 5-eh, which makes a double-time feel.

Critical reception
Steve Baltin from Cash Box stated that the song "should immediately make a mark" at Adult Contemporary, because of its producer, David Foster. He added that the Corrs "has a very soothing quality running through this string-based mid-tempo tune. With all the pluses working for it, the Corrs should strike quickly into the American pop scene." A reviewer from Music Week rated it four out of five, describing it as an "excellent single", with "touches of Fairground Attraction". Pan-European magazine Music & Media wrote, "Programmers who like their playlist material to be full of melody and harmony should stop here. The Corrs are four siblings from County Louth, Ireland, who specialise in blending stately and melodic pop with more traditional Celtic music, resulting in a record perfect for daytime ERR and ACE."

Music video
The accompanying music video for "Runaway", directed by Randee St. Nicholas, was shot in Dublin over two days in August 1995, featuring locations such as Phoenix Park and Pearse Railway Station.  Shot mostly in black-and-white, with flashes of colour in certain scenes, the video begins with Andrea on a train, looking out the window and singing, then follows the band as they sing and perform in several locations, including in a forest and on a train station platform, before ending with her getting off the train and running towards the camera.

Sharon once said this video should give fans an impression of what Ireland is like. Accordingly, it was raining the day the scenes where Andrea is running through the woods were shot.

Track listings

Charts

Weekly charts

Year-end charts

Certifications

Release history

Remix version

The song was re-released in February 1999, remixed by Tin Tin Out, reaching number two on the UK Singles Chart, held from the top by Britney Spears's debut single "...Baby One More Time". Atypical of Tin Tin Out's usual output and their previous remix of the Corrs' song "What Can I Do", the remix for "Runaway" is a lighter, more folk-oriented recording which utilizes a stripped back live band arrangement with a simple drum kit, a rhythmic bass guitar and a strummed acoustic guitar, retains Sharon Corr's fiddle from the original recording, features orchestral strings in the latter half of the song performed by the Duke Quartet and removes the rhythm change present in the original version.

Track listing

Music video
Dani Jacob's fourth Corrs video is, similar to "Love to Love You", compiled of backstage and concert footage; this time from one single gig at the Manchester Evening News Arena on 1 February 1999. It also includes a few scenes of the band in the recording studio with Tin Tin Out working on the remixed version of the song. Footage of the band walking through the corridor to the stage was later used for the intro for the rest of their concerts from 1999 to 2001.

Charts

Weekly charts

Year-end charts

Certifications

References

The Corrs songs
1994 songs
1995 debut singles
1999 singles
143 Records singles
Atlantic Records singles
Lava Records singles
Music videos directed by Randee St. Nicholas
Songs written by Andrea Corr